Belmont Township is a township in Warren County, Iowa, USA.

History
Many early settlers of Belmont Township hailed from Belmont County, Ohio, hence the name.

References

Townships in Warren County, Iowa
Townships in Iowa